Mali Cirnik is a small remote settlement in the eastern Gorjanci Hills in the Municipality of Brežice in eastern Slovenia, right on the border with Croatia. It no longer has any permanent residents. The area is part of the traditional region of Lower Carniola. It is now included in the Lower Sava Statistical Region.

References

External links
Mali Cirnik on Geopedia

Populated places in the Municipality of Brežice